White Diamond: A Personal Portrait of Kylie Minogue is a 2007 documentary film directed and produced by William Baker and chronicling the life of Australian singer Kylie Minogue during her concert tour Showgirl: The Homecoming Tour. It was filmed between August 2006 and March 2007 in both Australia and the United Kingdom.

Intended as an account of Minogue's return to the stage following her recovery from cancer, the film features on-stage and back-stage footage and interviews with several of Minogue's tour crew, including the director, William Baker. Kylie's sister Dannii and U2 lead singer Bono are also featured.

The film had a one-night premiere in each country, starting in the United Kingdom on 16 October 2007 and ending on 16 November 2007 in New Zealand.  It was later released on DVD in two editions: the European/United Kingdom edition and the Australian/New Zealand edition. These were later followed by a two-disc edition; the second disc contained a concert that was filmed during Kylie's Showgirl: The Homecoming Tour in Melbourne, Australia.

The title White Diamond was taken from one of Kylie's songs (written by Scissor Sisters). This song is the sole new song performed by her during Showgirl: The Homecoming Tour. The film opens with a reworked ballad version of it.

Two new songs, "I'm Hip" and "You Are There", are on the movie's soundtrack. Also on the soundtrack is "Alone Again", a previously unrecorded 2002 song that was co-written by Madonna and Rick Nowels.

Background and development
At the beginning of White Diamond, the director, William Baker, says: "For most people, Neighbours, 'I Should Be So Lucky,' Michael Hutchence, gold hot pants, 'Can't Get You Out of My Head,' and cancer equals Kylie. I want to rip that surface away."

On 17 May 2005, Kylie Minogue was forced to cancel the Australian leg of her Showgirl tour after being diagnosed with breast cancer. This is the story of her homecoming. (Introductory pre-credits text from White Diamond.)

White Diamond started out when Kylie's creative director and close friend William Baker was filming her for a personal record that was to be used as backstage bonus footage for the Showgirl: Homecoming Tour DVD. They had so much footage by the end of the tour, that they decided it would be better suited to a feature-length documentary format.

The original plan was to release it directly to DVD, but it was eventually given a single-day cinema release in some territories.

The film focuses on Kylie during her Australian and European tour, Showgirl: The Greatest Hits Tour. But during that tour, it was announced on 17 May 2005 that she had been diagnosed with breast cancer. This led to the postponement of the remainder of that tour and to her withdrawal from the Glastonbury Festival. After having had surgery on 21 May 2005, her tour later resumed in November 2006 in Australia, under the name Showgirl: The Homecoming Tour. Yet, while on this tour, Kylie was diagnosed with a respiratory tract infection. The tour was then postponed to January 2007.

Kylie stated that White Diamond was "a good way to thank the fans for their support and see where all their good wishes went. This started as quite a humble little project, and in many ways it still is." She had written on her website earlier in 2007: "I have to admit I was a little nervous to work on such a revealing project and I did pull the plug several times, but due to Willie's persistence it is now almost finished. It gives a great insight into the world of touring and the touring family."

Cast

Main roles
 Kylie Minogue – the Showgirl (as credited at the end of film)
 William Baker – director, photographer, and Kylie's best friend (known as "Dear")
 Dannii Minogue – Kylie's sister, who appeared in the film for the duet "Kids"
 Bono – who also appeared for the duet "Kids"
 Oliver Martinez – Kylie's former boyfriend, who made an appearance in some short scenes

Dancers
 Jason Beitel, Marco da Silva, Jamie Karitzis, Alan Lambie, Claire Meehan, Welly Locoh-Donou, Jason Piper, Nikoletta Rafaelisova, Andile Sotiya, Nikki Trow, Anoulka Yanminchey, Rachel Yau, and Terry Kvasnik

Production

Filming

A portion of White Diamond was shot in August 2006 in London, England, where Kylie had been living for 20 years. Kylie had travelled to Sadler's Wells studios for her dancing and choreography preparation for the Showgirl: Homecoming Tour. After that, the group went to Ealing, London, for musical rehearsals and to hold a promotional photo shoot.

Ruary McPhie filmed the England portion of the film (as noted in the end credits) because William Baker, the director, could not film there. While at Sadler's Wells, Baker said (in the film) that the tour would become a "bumpy ride" and would be emotional for everyone.

The group then went to Milan, Italy, for the designing of Kylie's outfits and costumes. While there, Kylie visited the fashion design company Dolce & Gabbana, who designed a cat-suit for her with gloves featuring "KM" on each glove.

Kylie also visited Chanel. They had travelled to Paris to get her custom-made Chanel Red Disc Dress. She had also had been invited to Paris Fashion Week. Kylie commented in the film that she was "blown away" and that she "loved it."

In November 2006, the group travelled to Sydney, Australia. While in Sydney, Kylie launched her perfume Darling. Later she performed in Brisbane, Australia, where she visited the Cancer Council. She said that the people there had "looked up to me and have been thinking about what I had been through," and that all of them had been "very brave" while fighting cancer.

After leaving Brisbane, she travelled to Byron Bay for a two-day break. She commented that her stay there was "freedom at last."

Kylie then travelled back to London and to the Wembley Arena for New Year's Eve. She celebrated there with the crew and the audience.

The last filming location was in Acapulco, Mexico, where Kylie did a commercial shoot and said that she would take a holiday there.

Music and soundtrack
Most of the songs in the film were performed by Kylie Minogue; however, the soundtrack also featured the English duo Pet Shop Boys, singing their song "Being Boring."

The Cure was also featured in the credits of the film for their song "Lovesong."

Liza Minnelli also had two songs featured in the film: "Rent" and "Losing My Mind."

"Kids" was sung with Dannii Minogue and Bono. The Bono version is on the tour's album, Showgirl: Homecoming Live, while the version with Dannii is a bonus feature on the movie DVD.

Kylie covered the songs "Vogue," "Try Your Wings," "You Are There," and "Diamonds Are a Girl's Best Friend."

All songs were published by EMI Ltd.

Critical reception

Most critics compared the film to Madonna's 1991 film Truth or Dare (also entitled In Bed with Madonna).

Kathy McCabe of The Daily Telegraph gave it a positive review, saying "Kylie Minogue reveals her hopes and fears but few tears in White Diamond." She also described the film as "sparkling."

The Evening Times gave the film 2 out of 5 stars. They said that Baker was too close to the subject of the film and that, "We never see Minogue cry, shout, bitch, get tipsy or mauldin."

Fans have said that Baker, the director and a close friend of Kylie's, put too much of himself into the film relative to Kylie's actual screen time. Caitlin Moran of The Times said that the documentary was made by "a very discreet friend" and that it runs "an arse-fatiguing two hours." Before adding that it "leaves you in no doubt that Kylie is a charming, merry, adorable, disco mouse with a fabulous collection of shoes."

Commercial performance
White Diamond premiered in the United Kingdom on 16 October 2007 at all Vue Cinema locations across the country in a one-night-only event. Kylie attended this premiere at the Leicester Square Vue Cinema. She arrived in a diamond-studded dress, wearing over $1,000,000 worth of jewellery. She was accompanied by her sister, Dannii, and actor Rupert Everett.

Similarly, in Australia there was a one-night-only premiere of the film at Village Cinemas on 19 October 2007 and in New Zealand at Skycity Cinemas on 16 November 2007. Everyone in New Zealand who attended the screening at the Skycity Cinemas received a free copy of Kylie's then-new single "2 Hearts."

Music credits

Video release

The documentary movie was released on DVD with a 15 rating on 10 December 2007.
It was filmed in HD and released to cinemas in HD. No Blu-ray release has been planned.

In the United Kingdom, it was released in a two-disc package. The second disc contains a concert (Showgirl: The Homecoming Tour) that was filmed in Kylie's hometown of Melbourne, Australia, on 11 December 2006. The concert is two hours and twenty minutes long.

The DVD also features bonus footage of Kylie and Dannii Minogue performing "Kids" in Melbourne's Rod Laver Arena on 16 December 2006, and five extra songs filmed in London's Earls Court on 6 May 2005.

White Diamond was shown on United Kingdom television on 25 November 2006 prior to its release on DVD. The DVD reached number three on the Mexican Top 10 Music DVD Chart when it was released in Mexico in February 2008.

It was released on DVD in New Zealand on 16 March 2009 by Shock Records. It was rated "General" by the OFLC of New Zealand.

Track listing
Act 1: Homecoming:
 "Overture"
 "Better the Devil You Know"
 "In Your Eyes"
 "White Diamond"
 "On a Night Like This"

Act 2: Everything Taboo:
 "Shocked" / "What Do I Have to Do?"
 "Spinning Around"

Act 3: Samsara:
 "Confide in Me"
 "Cowboy Style" / "Finer Feelings"
 "Too Far"

Act 4: Athletica:
 "Butterfly" (Remix Interlude)
 "Red Blooded Woman" / "Where the Wild Roses Grow"
 "Slow"
 "Kids"

Act 5: Dreams
 "Over the Rainbow"
 "Come into My World"
 "Chocolate"
 "I Believe in You"
 "Dreams"

Act 6: Pop Paradiso:
 "Burning Up" / "Vogue"
 "The Locomotion"
 "I Should Be So Lucky"
 "Hand on Your Heart"

Act 7: Dance of the Cybermen:
 "Can't Get You Out of My Head"
 "Light Years" / "Turn It into Love"

Encore:
 "Especially for You"
 "Love at First Sight"

Bonus features
 "Kids" (by Kylie and Dannii Minogue)
 Extra songs filmed at Earls Court:
 "In Denial"
 "Je Ne Sais Pas Pourquoi"
 "Confide in Me"
 "Please Stay"
 "Your Disco Needs You"

ROM section
 Weblinks
 Screensaver
 Wallpapers
 Gallery

See also
 X (Kylie Minogue album)  The song "White Diamond" is contained in the Australia and New Zealand iTunes bonus tracks of this album.

References

External links
 

2007 films
Kylie Minogue video albums
Australian independent films
Documentary films about singers
Live video albums
2007 video albums
Kylie Minogue live albums
2007 live albums
Documentary films about women in music
British independent films
Australian documentary films
British documentary films
2000s English-language films
2000s British films